The Lovesick is the fifth studio album by American singer-songwriter and musician Jason Reeves, self-released on August 16, 2011 on the label abeautifularmyoftrees in the United States. Recording and production for the album took place during early 2010 at The Evil 8-Bit Robot Factory recording studio in Nashville, Tennessee with producer Adam Smith.

Background
The Lovesick started production while Reeves was still under Warner Bros. Records in early 2010. The album was recorded in Nashville, TN at The Evil 8-bit Robot Factory. The studio owned by producer Adam B Smith and featured songs co-written with Danelle Leverett (one half of country duo The JaneDear Girls), Makana Rowan and Jordan Lawhead. Other collaborations include vocals from Colbie Caillat and Kara DioGuardi. The album's first single, "Helium Hearts," was released on July 27, 2010 by Warner Bros. Records. "Helium Hearts" was released with a music video and featured single cover art drawn by Reeves.

After the release of the "Helium Hearts" single, Reeves was dropped from the Warner Bros. Record label. He was allowed to keep the master tapes of the album which allowed him to later self-release the album. The second single "Sticks and Stones" was released on July 26, 2011, an entire year after the previous single. The album release of The Lovesick followed a month later on August 16, 2011. The album's cover and liner notes featured art and photography by Reeves.

Track listing

Personnel
Primary musicians
 Jason Reeves – acoustic guitar, vocals
 Adam B Smith – drums, bass, pianos, keyboards, programming, bells, vocals
 Jordan Lawhead – acoustic  guitar, electric guitar, vocals (5, 6, 8, 9)

Additional musicians

 Colbie Caillat – vocals (6)
 Kara DioGuardi – vocals (9)
 Danelle Leverett – vocals (1, 4, 5)
 Mike Payne – electric guitar (1, 4, 7)
 Cara Slaybaugh – cello (11)

Production personnel

 Adam B Smith – producer, engineer, mixer
 Mark Endert – mixer
 Serban Ghenea – mixer
 John Hanes – engineer
 Tim Roberts – assistant engineer
 Joe Zook – mixer
 Ted Jensen – mastering
 Jason Reeves –photography, artwork
 Josh Newton – photography
 Makana Rowan – photography

Charts

References

2011 albums
Jason Reeves (songwriter) albums